Miss Mozambique is a national beauty pageant in Mozambique.

History
Miss Mozambique was founded in 2015 and will send her delegates in 2015 Miss World pageant to represent Mozambique.

Titleholders 
Color key

Mozambique
Recurring events established in 2015
2015 establishments in Mozambique